William Dodge may refer to:

 William E. Dodge (1805–1883), American politician, businessman, and general
 William E. Dodge Jr. (1833–1903), American businessperson and philanthropist
 W. Earl Dodge (1858–1886), college football player
 William de Leftwich Dodge (1867–1935), American artist
 William Dodge (bobsleigh) (1925–1987), American bobsledder
 William C. Dodge (1880–1973), American lawyer and politician from New York
 William I. Dodge (c. 1789–1873), American politician from New York
 William Hanson Dodge (died 1932), American photographer
 Bill Dodge, American law professor at UC Hastings
 Bill Dodge (footballer) (born 1937), former English footballer

See also 
 William Dodge Sample, U.S. naval officer